The men's 50 metre freestyle S5 event at the 2012 Paralympic Games took place on 30 August, at the London Aquatics Centre.

Two heats were held, each with eight swimmers. The swimmers with the eight fastest times advanced to the final.

Heats

Heat 1

Heat 2

Final

References

Swimming at the 2012 Summer Paralympics